Mob Squad may refer to:

Mob Squad (album), 2003
Mob Squad (American football), referring to the Rams NFL team